An Air force ensign is a flag used by a national air force.

With the creation of independent air forces in the first half of the 20th century, a range of distinguishing flags and ensigns were adopted.  Such flags may often feature a roundel in the national colours.

Notable examples include:
Royal Air Force Ensign
Royal Australian Air Force Ensign
Royal Canadian Air Force Ensign
Royal New Zealand Air Force Ensign

Air force flags
Some countries, such as the United States, designate their national air force standards as flags not ensigns.  See the Flag of the United States Air Force for an example.

References

 *